Dapp or DAPP may refer to:

People
 Scot Dapp (born 1951), former American football and baseball coach

Places
 Dapp, Alberta, a hamlet in Canada

Science and technology
 DAPP, a compound used as a radioligand that binds to the serotonin transporter
 Data Acquisition and Processing Program, former name of the US Defense Meteorological Satellite Program
 Decentralized application (DApp, dApp, Dapp, or dapp), a computer application
 Dimensional Assessment of Personality Pathology, a psychological assessment; See Schedule for Nonadaptive and Adaptive Personality
 Distributed application, software that is executed or run on multiple computers within a network

Other uses
 Dapp, character on the Japanese TV show Gekisou Sentai Carranger
 Development Aid from People to People, charitable organization alleged to be run by Danish confederation Tvind
 Dapp (card game), German dialect name for the card game of Tapp

See also
 Dap (disambiguation)